Against Nature may refer to:

 Against Nature (album) (1989), a rock album by The Fatima Mansions
 Against Nature, a 2015 album by Marc Almond
 Against Nature?, a museum exhibition on homosexuality in animals
 Against Nature (band), a doom metal band from Baltimore, MD
 Against Nature (Obverse Books), a science fiction novel by Lawrence Burton
 Against Nature (documentary), a television documentary by Martin Durkin
 À rebours, a 1883 French novel by Joris-Karl Huysmans

See also 
 Crime against nature